1990 JSL Cup Final was the 15th final of the JSL Cup competition. The final was played at Nagoya Mizuho Athletics Stadium in Aichi on September 2, 1990. Nissan Motors won the championship.

Overview
Defending champion Nissan Motors won their 3rd title, by defeating Furukawa Electric 3–1 with Renato and Kazushi Kimura goal. Nissan Motors won the title for 3 years in a row.

Match details

See also
1990 JSL Cup

References

JSL Cup
1990 in Japanese football
Yokohama F. Marinos matches
JEF United Chiba matches